Palamon Capital Partners is a London-based private equity firm. It was founded in 1999, and is headquartered at 60 Charlotte Street, London.

It was founded in 1999 by Louis G. Elson, Managing Partner and Head of Operating Committee, and A. Michael Hoffman.

In January 2017, Palamon acquired a majority share in the Swedish retailer Happy Socks, valuing the company at US$85.4 million.

It bought Mydentist from the Carlyle Group in May 2021.

References

External links

Private equity firms of the United Kingdom
Financial services companies established in 1999
Financial services companies based in London
1999 establishments in England
British companies established in 1999